James McCourt is a British television presenter/host, royal expert, correspondent, and celebrity interviewer.

Career

Television
James is a host, celebrity interviewer, correspondent, a certified life coach and a royal expert for CNN International, E! The Real Princess Diaries: From Diana to Meghan, Weekend Express and The Daily Share on HLN (TV channel), Extra on NBC, Game Show Network's Cover Story and in 2019 Entertainment Tonight's ET Live in the same capacity. He also writes for Life & Style (magazine), In Touch Weekly and Closer Weekly for Bauer Media Group on this subject.

James has appeared as one of the Los Angeles correspondents for Good Morning Britain, appearing for the first time in August 2015 and a showbiz correspondent for Talkradio since March 2016. In the UK he has hosted various The National Lottery Draws on BBC One as well as the EuroMillions draw on UKTV Gold. He reported for Travel Channel and hosted Studio Disney UK, Hot Wired, an educational programme for Channel 4 and Glory ball for Challenge.

James has appeared in the United States on TV Guide Network, hosting Diana: Memories of a Princess and featured regularly as their UK correspondent. He could also be seen on the new E! entertainment series "Sexiest....", was the live voice of '1 vs. 100' via Xbox Live Primetime in the UK and Ireland during Season 1.

In his early career James worked for BBC Radio Sheffield and was lead singer of his own pop band - he still occasionally writes songs for musical theatre shows.

Personal life
His younger brother is the television and radio presenter Richard McCourt, of Dick and Dom fame.

References

External links

Living people
People educated at Tapton School
British television presenters
Year of birth missing (living people)